Robert Mikhailovich Shwartzman (born 16 September 1999) is a Russo-Israeli racing driver who currently serves as a reserve driver for the Scuderia Ferrari Formula One team. He is also set to compete in the 2023 GT World Challenge Europe Endurance Cup, driving for AF Corse. Shwartzman last competed in the FIA Formula 2 Championship in 2020 and 2021 where he finished 4th and 2nd respectively. He was a member of the Ferrari Driver Academy, and is the 2018 Toyota Racing Series and 2019 FIA Formula 3 champion.

Early career

Karting 
Born in Israel and raised in Saint Petersburg and Italy, Shwartzman began karting in 2004 at the age of five. Throughout a seven-year career of karting professionally, he claimed karting titles across Europe (predominantly in Italy).

Formula 4

Italian F4 
In 2014, Shwartzman graduated to single-seaters, partaking in six races of the Italian F4 Championship with Cram Motorsport. He finished in the points four times out of the six, to rank sixteenth overall with 26 points.

The following year, Shwartzman partook in the championship full-time with Mücke Motorsport. Shwartzman claimed his first single-seater podium at just the first race at Valleluga. He later took his maiden wins at Adria. Overall, Shwartzman claimed three wins and finished third in the standings with 212 points behind the Prema Powerteam duo of Ralf Aron and Guanyu Zhou.

ADAC F4 
During that year, he also partook in the inaugural ADAC Formula 4 championship. He had a run of six consecutive podiums but did not record a win. He was unable to finish the season, but finished fourth in the standings.

Formula Renault

2016 
In 2016, Shwartzman moved to Formula Renault 2.0 with reigning series champions Josef Kaufmann Racing after testing with the team at Motorland Aragon. He claimed two victories in the Northern European Cup and finished sixth in the standings. In the Eurocup, Shwartzman finished eighth.

2017 

For 2017, Shwartzman stayed in Formula Renault 2.0, but decided to switch to the R-ace GP team. He lost thirteen points to his teammate Will Palmer and finished in the third place in the driver standings, but was able to win six races, having podium finish at all rounds excepting Red Bull Ring, and at Circuit Paul Ricard.

GP3 Series 
In November 2016, Shwartzman was listed among the drivers partaking in the post-season test at Yas Marina with Koiranen GP.

Toyota Racing Series 
Shwartzman made his Toyota Racing Series debut during the 2018 off-season, competing for M2 Competition. He finished all fifteen races in the top-five and was the only driver in the season to do so. He won the Denny Hulme Memorial Trophy and the series title, ahead of the M2 teammates Richard Verschoor and Marcus Armstrong, who have raced in the series in 2017.

FIA Formula 3 European Championship 

In September 2017, Shwartzman tested the European Formula 3 machinery with Prema Powerteam. After his tests with Prema he was included into the Ferrari Driver Academy. In December 2017, it was confirmed that he will race for Prema in 2018 FIA Formula 3 European Championship. Shwartzman took his first European Formula 3 win in the third Spielberg race. With his second win in the season finale he outscored another Ferrari Driver Academy member Marcus Armstrong in the drivers' standings, completing the top-three with claiming the rookie title.

FIA Formula 3 Championship 

Following the merger of the FIA Formula 3 European Championship and GP3 Series into the new FIA Formula 3 Championship in 2019, Prema announced Shwartzman as one of its drivers for the inaugural season. Shwartzman qualified on pole for the first Barcelona race and initially finished the race in second before being promoted to race winner following a time penalty to Christian Lundgaard. In the following day's race, he finished fourth.

He took third place at qualifying in Circuit Paul Ricard and finished second in the first race, losing only to his team-mate Jehan Daruvala. After starting from seventh in the grid, at the sprint race, he took his second victory. At the Red Bull Ring Shwartzman qualified only 12th, after suffering from technical issues. He went up to fifth in the first race, and in the next race he battled with Marcus Armstrong, but at the final lap made contact. Armstrong retired and Shwartzman crossed the finish line in first, but was given a five-second time penalty for causing a collision, dropping him down to third behind race winner HWA Racelab driver Jake Hughes, who took victory here last year, and Jehan Daruvala.

At Silverstone Shwartzman qualified sixth. It looked like he would finish in the same position, but with 3 laps remaining he overtook Christian Lundgaard. Later, Pedro Piquet also overtook him. On Sunday, he finished second with the fastest lap, behind Hitech Grand Prix and race winner Leonardo Pulcini who took two victories in the 2018 GP3 Series – at Sochi and Abu Dhabi – all victories for the Italian were at the feature races. At the Hungaroring, it was the first weekend for the Russian driver to not score any podiums - he qualified fourth, but following a poor start, finished only in fifth. The following day, he was set to take third position, however retired following difficulties in tyre management and a collision with Felipe Drugovich. At Spa-Francorchamps Shwartzman qualified in fourth position, and overtook Jehan Daruvala and Marcus Armstrong to finish in second place. In the following sprint race, he finished third behind Yuki Tsunoda, and Marcus Armstrong.

At Monza, he qualified third, and despite a five-place grid penalty, was able to win his third race of the year. In the sprint, he took eight place by a margin of 0.067 seconds over Christian Lundgaard and to take the final point. Shwartzman took the pole position ahead of his home race at Sochi, but he couldn't save his race lead and finished second behind Armstrong. However, Shwartzman's point advantage on Daruvala was enough for him to clinch the championship title.

FIA Formula 2 Championship

2020 
Shwartzman joined Prema Racing for the 2020 FIA Formula 2 Championship, partnering Mick Schumacher.
The season was planned to begin in March, but was postponed until July due to COVID-19 pandemic. On 18 April 2020, Shwartzman's father died of COVID-19 aged 52. On his rookie season of F2, Shwartzman expected his season as "toughest season of my life" mainly due to his father's death. Shwartzman qualified eighth on the opening race at the Red Bull Ring in Austria. He made a good start, moving up to fifth and later taking advantage for a mechanical issue for Guanyu Zhou and a mistake from Schumacher. This led him to take a podium finish on his Formula 2 debut, taking 3rd place in the feature race.  Shwartzman finished in fourth, two places higher than where he started due to retirements from Giuliano Alesi and former Formula 3 teammate Marcus Armstrong. Shwartzman took his first Formula 2 victory at the feature race of the second Red Bull Ring round, having started eighth. He took the lead from Zhou with nine laps to go. Over the cool-down lap, Shwartzman dedicated the victory to his late father. After the race, Shwartzman described that the red flag "saved" him at the start of the race. However, in the sprint race, his fortunes were reversed by spinning out on the first lap on his own and retiring.

The next feature race at the Hungaroring saw Shwartzman qualify in 11th position. He left the first turn of the first lap five places ahead in sixth. He had a tire strategy different from the front-runners and had better tyre management. He was in a different world after his pit stop, overtaking Luca Ghiotto and Callum Ilott at the end of lap 29, and taking the lead from Schumacher just a lap later. Eventually, he won the race with a 15-second gap. In doing so, Shwartzman took the championship lead. In the sprint race, Shwartzman finished in fourth, passing a few drivers in the race. In Silverstone, Shwartzman qualified a lowly 18th. He struggled for pace in both the feature and sprint races, finishing 14th and 13th respectively. The second Silverstone weekend would prove to be a little better, with Shwartzman qualifying in 11th. He ended the feature race in eighth, passing Dan Ticktum for the reverse-grid position with five laps to go. Shwartzman led the race for the majority of the sprint race, until with thiree laps to go, Schumacher tried to pass him, but smashed into his front-right tyre, damaging Shwartzman's front wing. They were overtaken by Yuki Tsunoda who went on to win the race. Shwartzman was soon swarmed by the field, and in the end finished 13th. His result saw him lose the championship lead. Shwartzman back in top form again in Barcelona, qualifying second and taking the lead from Ilott into the first corner. On lap 8, however, the British driver would reclaim it back. Shwartzman survived a dramatic late safety car restart to finish in second place, only losing out to a timely pitstop from Nobuharu Matsushita. During the sprint race, Shwartzman was hit with massive tyre degradation and only managed 13th.

Shwartzman topped free practice for the first time and qualified fourth at Spa-Francorchamps. He fell to seventh on the opening lap but made it up to finish fifth. During the sprint race, Shwartzman passed a slow starting Guanyu Zhou. He grabbed his opportnity after Ticktum and Roy Nissany collided. From then on, he would control the race and eventually win by 9 seconds. Shwartzman improved to ninth after starting 16th at Monza, but was just less than a second away from Louis Delétraz from taking reverse pole. He managed to progress to sixth place in the sprint race, before being promoted a place after Ticktum was disqualified. Shwartzman qualified ninth for the round at Mugello. He would retire with a car issue at the halfway mark of the feature race. Shwartzman stormed back to ninth in the sprint race despite a mistake on lap 18 but was not enough to nab points.

At his home event at Sochi Autodrom, Shwartzman qualified seventh. However, a slow pit stop costed Shwartzman and soon slipping down to 11th. Shwartzman only finished 10th in a red-flagged sprint race, capping off another point-less weekend. Following the weekend, Shwartzman sat fifth in the standings, a distant 51 points off championship leader Schumacher. Shwartzman qualified 14th in the first of two rounds in Bahrain. He pushed his way up into fifth place, but fell to eighth after drivers on fresher and softer tyres overtook him. However, he did manage to get reverse pole. He converted it to a dominant win, leading every lap. Shwartzman qualified fourth at the second Sakhir round. He improved ahead to second on the first lap, passing both Carlin drivers. He eventually was passed by Tsunoda, and later in the race by Guanyu Zhou and Felipe Drugovich. He finished in fifth, but when Nikita Mazepin was penalised, he was moved to fourth position. Shwartzman placed 5th in the sprint race. Overall, Shwartzman ranked 4th in the standings with 177 points, but ultimately was beaten by teammate Schumacher who became champion. During the season, he collected six podiums, a fastest lap and four wins — the most wins of any driver during the season.

2021 
He continued with Prema for the 2021 FIA Formula 2 Championship, this time partnering the reigning FIA Formula 3 champion, Oscar Piastri. Shwartzman endured a shaky start on the first round at Bahrain, qualifying 12th. He improved to fourth on the opening race in Bahrain. He retired in the second race, after making contact with Dan Ticktum. He finished seventh in the feature race. In Monaco, Shwartzman topped practice and qualified second. Shwartzman brushed the barrier on the first lap during the first sprint race, damaging his front wing and later retired. From last, Shwartzman rose to tenth courtesy of retirements to finish tenth. Shwartzman was on course to take second in the feature race before a slow pit stop caused him to lose positions to Piastri and Felipe Drugovich, ending the race in fourth.

Shwartzman qualified tenth in Baku, and started from reverse pole in the first race. He then scored his first win of the season, winning by five seconds. He finished fifth in the second sprint race, and ended the weekend in third place, taking advantage of multiple incidents and penalties for other drivers. In Silverstone, Shwartzman qualified seventh. He won once again, having a brilliant start to pass Christian Lundgaard, Jüri Vips and Roy Nissany before the first corner. He described his win as "redemption" following his win being taken away the previous year due to a collision. In the second sprint race, Shwartzman was running just outside the points when he spun on the penultimate corner on the penultimate lap, dropping him to 15th at the flag. He bounced back to secure fifth in the feature race.

Shwartzman qualified 12th in Monza. During the first sprint race, Shwartzman benefitted from incidents and failures from other drivers saw him run in third place. However, Shwartzman was awarded a 5-second time penalty for leaving the track and gaining an advantage at the start of the race. He was demoted to sixth, and promoted Lundgaard who started 19th to finish on the podium. He managed to claim third in the second sprint, after overtaking Liam Lawson, Vips, and David Beckmann. Shwartzman rounded off his weekend with a sixth place finish in the feature race. In Sochi, Shwartzman qualified seventh. Shwartzman got his home podium in mixed conditions by finishing third, after a battle with Jake Hughes and an incident for Lawson. Following a cancelled sprint 2 due to bad weather, he raced to fourth place in the feature race, finishing just two seconds shy of 3rd place Jehan Daruvala.

Shwartzman qualified second from following up with fastest in free practice, forming a Prema front row lockout in Jeddah. Shwartzman finished fifth in sprint 1, following a battle with Lundgaard. Shwartzman would finish 5th on the road, but following penalties for Lundgaard and Daruvala, he was promoted to third place. In the red-flagged feature race, Shwartzman finished second behind Piastri. His performance in Jeddah moved him ahead of Guanyu Zhou into second place in the championship. At the season finale in Abu Dhabi, Shwartzman qualified fourth and finished in the same place that he qualified in the first sprint race. However, as Piastri finished third, he claimed the title with two races to go, meaning that Shwartzman's title challenge was over. Shwartzman finished second in the second sprint, making up two places at the start. He then overtook Ticktum and Ralph Boschung whilst benefitting from a retirement by Marcus Armstrong. Shwartzman ended the feature race in fifth place, after being passed by Théo Pourchaire and Drugovich in the dying stages of the race. He finished the 2021 season as vice-champion with 2 wins, 3 fastest laps and 8 podiums in total. He also achieved a total of 192 points that year, albeit 60.5 points off champion Piastri. Following his successful two F2 campaigns, Shwartzman left the series.

Formula One 
However, he did not appear on the entry list. He took part in the 2021 post-season young driver test with Haas and Ferrari.

Shwartzman is a test driver for Ferrari in 2022, he is due to compete as Israeli after the FIA banned drivers from competing under the Russian flag following the 2022 Russian invasion of Ukraine. He also participated in a test with the Ferrari SF21 in September, at the Fiorano circuit together with Antonio Giovinazzi, in order to prepare them both for the free practice sessions in which they were to compete. At his first free practice outing, Shwartzman finished the session 16th, highest of the rookies but well down on his teammate who set the fastest time. He described his experience as "awesome and hard". In his second free practice, in Abu Dhabi, he was classified seventh. Shwartzman also participated in the 2022 post-season tests with Ferrari. 

In 2023, Shwartzman was released from the Ferrari Driver Academy, but was promoted to serve as the Ferrari reserve for 2023.

IndyCar 
At the start of January 2023, Shwartzman partook in an IndyCar test with Chip Ganassi Racing.

Sportscar racing

GT World Challenge 
Shwartzman returned to competition in 2023, pairing up with Nicklas Nielsen and Alessio Rovera at AF Corse in the GT World Challenge Europe Endurance Cup, thus making his debut in sportscar racing.

Karting record

Karting career summary

Racing record

Racing career summary 

† As Shwartzman was a guest driver, he was ineligible for points.

Complete Italian F4 Championship results 
(key) (Races in bold indicate pole position) (Races in italics indicate fastest lap)

Complete ADAC Formula 4 Championship results 
(key) (Races in bold indicate pole position) (Races in italics indicate fastest lap)

Complete Formula Renault Eurocup results
(key) (Races in bold indicate pole position) (Races in italics indicate fastest lap)

Complete Formula Renault Northern European Cup results 
(key) (Races in bold indicate pole position) (Races in italics indicate fastest lap)

† As Shwartzman was a guest driver, he was ineligible to score points.

Complete Toyota Racing Series results 
(key) (Races in bold indicate pole position) (Races in italics indicate fastest lap)

Complete FIA Formula 3 European Championship results
(key) (Races in bold indicate pole position) (Races in italics indicate fastest lap)

‡ Half points awarded as less than 75% of race distance was completed.

Complete Macau Grand Prix results

Complete FIA Formula 3 Championship results
(key) (Races in bold indicate pole position; races in italics indicate points for the fastest lap of top ten finishers)

Complete FIA Formula 2 Championship results
(key) (Races in bold indicate pole position) (Races in italics indicate points for the fastest lap of top ten finishers)

‡ Half points awarded as less than 75% of race distance was completed.

Complete Formula One participations 
(key) (Races in bold indicate pole position) (Races in italics indicate fastest lap)

* Season still in progress.

Notes

References

External links

1999 births
Living people
Russian racing drivers
Israeli racing drivers
Sportspeople from Tel Aviv
Italian F4 Championship drivers
ADAC Formula 4 drivers
Formula Renault Eurocup drivers
Formula Renault 2.0 NEC drivers
Toyota Racing Series drivers
FIA Formula 3 European Championship drivers
FIA Formula 3 Championship drivers
FIA Formula 2 Championship drivers
Cram Competition drivers
Mücke Motorsport drivers
Josef Kaufmann Racing drivers
R-ace GP drivers
M2 Competition drivers
Prema Powerteam drivers
FIA Formula 3 Champions
SMP Racing drivers
Karting World Championship drivers
Ferrari Competizioni GT drivers
Russian expatriate sportspeople in Italy
Israeli expatriate sportspeople in Italy
AF Corse drivers